The 1939–40 season would have been Newport County's first season in the Football League Second Division and their 19th season overall in the Football League.  However, due to the outbreak of war in Europe in September 1939, the league season was abandoned after just three games and the results expunged from the records. For this reason, appearances made and goals scored in the Football League matches that were played do not contribute to a player's overall appearances and goals record.

Many of Newport County's players went off to fight in the war, but for those who remained, the Football League organised a special War League. The War League was originally split into ten regional divisions (Newport County were placed in the South-Western Division), in accordance with the Government's 50-mile travel limit. A War League Cup was also set up to replace the FA Cup, which had also been interrupted at the preliminary round phase.

Fixtures and results

Second Division

War League (South-West)

War League Cup (South-West)

Welsh Cup

League table

Pld = Matches played; W = Matches won; D = Matches drawn; L = Matches lost; F = Goals for; A = Goals against;GA = Goal average; GD = Goal difference; Pts = Points

External links
 Welsh Cup 1939/40
 Division 2 1939/40

Sources
Amber in the Blood: History of Newport County F.C. 

1939-40
English football clubs 1939–40 season
1939–40 in Welsh football